"You Say You Will" is a song written by Beth Nielsen Chapman and Verlon Thompson. It was originally recorded by Holly Dunn for her 1992 album Getting It Dunn and later by American country music artist Trisha Yearwood. It was released in March 1993.  Yearwood's version was the third single from her album Hearts in Armor. The song reached number 12 on the Billboard Hot Country Singles & Tracks chart in May 1993.

Chapman also recorded the song on her 1993 LP, You Hold the Key.

Chart performance
"You Say You Will" debuted at number 58 on the U.S. Billboard Hot Country Singles & Tracks for the week of March 6, 1993.

References

1992 songs
1993 singles
Holly Dunn songs
Trisha Yearwood songs
MCA Records singles
Songs written by Beth Nielsen Chapman
Songs written by Verlon Thompson
Song recordings produced by Garth Fundis